École secondaire catholique Thériault is a secondary school located in Timmins, Ontario. It is a Francophone Roman Catholic school administered by the Conseil scolaire catholique de district des Grandes-Rivières with some 1000 students. The school is named after Père Charles-Eugène Thériault, one of the founders of the city of Timmins.

The school was founded in 1968 with the amalgamation of Collège Sacré-Coeur, Collège Notre-Dame and l'Académie Don Bosco. The present building was completed in 1972. It houses a common area known as the Agora, a cafeteria, 750-seat auditorium named after Charles Fournier, the school's former vice-principal, two gymnasiums, and a track and field complex. The auditorium is the largest in the city. École secondaire catholique Thériault was once the largest francophone secondary school in the province of Ontario when the student population was close to 2 000 students in the late 1970s. The cross country running program was headed by Frère Roland Saumur and has won many NEOAA (formerly I.A.G.B.) team and individual championships as well as many OFSAA medals. The school also offers many other sports including badminton, curling, volleyball, wrestling, among others. The school held a reunion for its 15th anniversary in 1993. The Class of 1988 celebrated the 20th anniversary of their graduation with a reunion in August 2008.

The current principal is Yves Poitras. Alain Bédard and Luc Meunier are Vice-Principals. The school has hosted such pan-Ontarian francophone events as Les Jeux Franco-Ontariens (2006) and the improvisational provincial tournament known as "L'Association franco-ontarienne des ligues d'improvisation étudiantes" (1989, 2000).

See also
List of high schools in Ontario

References

External links
 École secondaire catholique Thériault
 Thériault Cross-Country
 Conseil scolaire catholique de district des Grandes Rivières

French-language high schools in Ontario
Catholic secondary schools in Ontario
High schools in Timmins